Syncada is a global financial supply chain network that offers business-to-business payments in the cloud under the software as a service (SaaS) model.

A joint venture between Visa and U.S. Bancorp, Syncada launched in July 2009. U.S. Bank was Syncada's first bank customer. Commerce Bank was the second to join the network in 2010.  In March 2011, Citibank became the third bank to use the network.

US Bank has bought back the shares of Syncada from Visa and Syncada is being functionalized within US Bank Corporate Payments Group.

History

Syncada's creation stems from PowerTrack, an online platform for invoice processing, payment and trade financing, launched by U.S. Bancorp in 1997. In 2009, U.S. Bancorp divested PowerTrack

Management

In January 2010, Syncada named Kurt Schneiber Chief Executive Officer. He joined from Fortent, an anti-money-laundering software provider, where he was president. He received recognition as one of Treasury & Risk's most-influential people in finance for 2011. Schneiber also has prior experience at Citi. In September, it named Kay LaBare Chief Information Officer.

References

External links
 

U.S. Bancorp
Financial services companies of the United States